Drug Testing and Analysis is a monthly peer-reviewed scientific journal established in 2009 and published by John Wiley & Sons.  It focuses on six key topics: sports doping, illicit/recreational drug use, pharmaceutics, toxico-pathology, forensics/homeland security, and environment.

The current editor-in-chief is Mario Thevis (German Sport University Cologne).

Abstracting and indexing 
The journal is abstracted and indexed in Chemical Abstracts Service, EMBASE, MEDLINE/PubMed, Science Citation Index Expanded, and Scopus.

References

External links 
 

Wiley (publisher) academic journals
Pharmacology journals
Monthly journals
Publications established in 2009
English-language journals